ADK Damashii is a compilation of video games by SNK Playmore released on December 18, 2008 for PlayStation 2, exclusively in Japan. It was later ported outside of Japan for PlayStation 4 in 2017.

It includes 5 arcade/Neo Geo games which were all developed by ADK and published by SNK Playmore. All 5 are 1:1 arcade ports with only one small enhancement in the form of skill lists/move lists for the characters of the fighting games; nothing else was changed. They are all 2D Games and every game is for 1-2 players. Unlike all the other Japanese versions of Neo Geo game compilations for PS2, it had no online modes.

Games
Aggressors of Dark Kombat (abbreviated ADK) is a one-on-one fighting arcade game released by SNK and developed by Alpha Denshi Corp. (ADK).
Ninja Master's: Haō Ninpō Chō is a ninja-themed one-on-one fighting game produced by ADK and published by SNK.
Ninja Combat is a 1990 side-scrolling action game, developed by ADK and published by SNK. 
Ninja Commando is a top down, vertically scrolling run and gun arcade game developed by ADK and published by SNK.
Twinkle Star Sprites is a competitive scrolling shooter created by ADK and published by SNK.

See also
ADK
SNK Playmore
Neo Geo

References  

2008 video games
Japan-exclusive video games
PlayStation 2 games
PlayStation 4 games
PlayStation Network games
SNK Playmore games
SNK game compilations
Video games about ninja
Video games developed in Japan